The University of Oriente - Santiago de Cuba (UO) is a university located in Santiago de Cuba, Cuba. It was founded in 1947 and is organized in 12 Faculties.

Organization
These are the 12 faculties in which the university is divided into:

 Faculty of Social Sciences
 Faculty of Humanities
 Faculty of Law
 Faculty of Economics and Management
 Faculty of Natural Sciences
 Faculty of Mathematics and Computer Science
 Faculty of Distance Education
 Faculty of Chemical Engineering
 Faculty of Mechanical Engineering
 Faculty of Electrical Engineering
 Faculty of Construction
 Faculty of Medicine

See also

Education in Cuba
List of universities in Cuba
 Santiago de Cuba

External links
 

Santiago de Cuba
Buildings and structures in Santiago de Cuba
Educational institutions established in 1947
1947 establishments in Cuba